Reboleira station is the northern terminus on the Blue Line of the Lisbon Metro.

History
It opened on April 13, 2016. The station is located on Rua das Indústrias, connecting to the Reboleira Railway Station (Sintra Line). 

The architectural design of the station is by Leopoldo de Almeida Rosa.

Connections

Urban buses

Carris 
 767 Campo Mártires da Pátria ⇄ Reboleira (Metro)

Suburban buses

Vimeca / Lisboa Transportes 
 20 Algés (Estação) ⇄ Amadora (Estação Sul)
 105 Queluz (Monte Abraão) ⇄ Reboleira (Metro)
 108 Reboleira (Metro) ⇄ Estação Queluz/Belas
 109 Reboleira (Estação) - Circulação via Damaia de Cima
 144 Belém (Estação) ⇄ Cacém (Bairro do Grajal)
 145 Reboleira (Estação) - Circulação via Urbanização Casas do Lago / Amadora (Hospital)
 185 Lisboa (Marquês de Pombal) ⇄ Amadora (Hospital)
 186 Amadora (Hospital) ⇄ Falagueira (Estação)
 189 Amadora (Estação Sul) ⇄ Falagueira (Estação)

Rail

Comboios de Portugal 
 Sintra ⇄ Lisboa - Rossio
 Sintra ⇄ Lisboa - Oriente
 Sintra ⇄ Alverca
 Mira Sintra/Meleças ⇄ Lisboa - Rossio

See also
 List of Lisbon metro stations

References

External links

Blue Line (Lisbon Metro) stations
Railway stations opened in 2016